The Koningin Regentes class was a class of coastal defence ships of the Royal Netherlands Navy. The class comprised Koningin Regentes, De Ruyter and Hertog Hendrik.

Design

The main armament of the ships were two  single turret guns. Secondary armament included four single  guns and eight  single guns.

Construction

Notes

External links

Description of class

Coastal defence ships of the Royal Netherlands Navy
19th-century naval ships of the Netherlands